Tarasht Metro Station is a station in Tehran Metro Line 2. It is located in Shahid Golab Street. It is between Sharif University Metro Station and Sadeghieh (Tehran) Metro Station.

In 2005, the radon concentration was measured in this station, and found to be 9 Bq/m3. The threshold permissible concentration is 148 Bq/m3.

References

Tehran Metro stations